Rodès is a town in southern France.

Rodes may also refer to:

People
Rodes, people with the surname Rodes
Rodes K. Myers, Lt. Governor of Kentucky, United States (1939–1943)

Places
Pizzo di Rodes, a mountain in Lombardy, Italy
Rodes, West Virginia, United States, a small town in Raleigh County

Other
Rodes baronets, a title in England (1641–1743)